Liberation Church is a non-denominational Christian ministry in Richmond, Virginia. It was founded in 2009 by Jay Patrick. The church is currently located at the old Celebration Church plot on Midlothian Turnpike. Next to it is one of the church's thrift stores, "The Love of Jesus Thrift Store".

Merger with Celebration Church
In April 2021, Pastors Jay and Ashley Patrick announced that Celebrations Church's board of directors had gifted Liberation Church the property of Celebration Church debt-free. It included a 135,00 sq ft sanctuary, commercial workout facility, and a full service cafe. An additional property was also given for women who are suffering human trafficking and domestic violence. Before Liberation Church was gifted Celebration's property, Pastor Jay Patrick was already giving sermons at the location on Saturday evenings.

References

External links
 

Evangelicalism in Virginia
Organizations based in Richmond, Virginia